William Caswell (September 24, 1754January 6, 1785) was an American politician, lawyer, and planter. Besides service on state court benches, he represented Dobbs County in the North Carolina House of Commons from 1779 to 1784. He was also a senior officer who commanded militia during the American Revolution.

Biography

William Caswell, the son of Richard and Mary ( Mackilwean) Caswell, was born September 24, 1754, in Johnston County (present-day Lenoir County), North Carolina. He received training by apprenticeship in law and served as the register of deeds for Dobbs County. He attended the Continental Congress in Philadelphia in 1774 with his father. Caswell was elected to the North Carolina House of Commons in 1779 (second session), 1780-1781, 1782, and 1784. After the American Revolution, he resided at his plantation, "Red House," near Kinston, where he died on January 6, 1785.

During the American Revolutionary War, Caswell saw service as a brigadier general commanding Caswell's Brigade, North Carolina militia; appointed May 9, 1779 (1779-1783). Caswell previously served as an ensign in the 2nd North Carolina Regiment, commissioned September 1, 1775 (1775-1776); a captain in the 5th North Carolina Regiment (1776-1778); and Colonel of The Dobbs Regiment, North Carolina militia (1779), appointed 2nd colonel during the third quarter of 1778.

References

External links

 William Caswell papers at the University of North Carolina at Chapel Hill
 William Caswell at The Political Graveyard

1754 births
1785 deaths
18th-century American judges
18th-century American lawyers
18th-century American politicians
American lawyers admitted to the practice of law by reading law
County judges in the United States
Deaths in North Carolina
Farmers from North Carolina
Members of the North Carolina House of Representatives
Militia generals in the American Revolution
North Carolina lawyers
North Carolina militiamen in the American Revolution
People of colonial North Carolina
People from Dobbs County, North Carolina
People from Johnston County, North Carolina
People from Kinston, North Carolina